Mr. Majnu is a 2019 Indian Telugu language romantic comedy film written and directed by Venky Atluri, and produced by B. V. S. N. Prasad under Sri Venkateswara Cine Chitra. The film features Akhil Akkineni and Nidhhi Agerwal in lead roles. Upon release, the film received mixed reviews, with praise towards Akhil and Nidhhi's performance, and the soundtrack, but criticism towards the plot. The film became a commercial failure at the box-office.

The film was dubbed and released in Hindi on YouTube by Goldmines Telefilms on 4 July 2020 and it crossed more than 238 million views. The film had also been dubbed in Tamil as Maanidhan. The film was remade in Odia with the same name, starring Babushaan Mohanty and Divyadisha Mohanty in the lead roles.

Plot
Vikram Krishna alias Vicky is a handsome young man, who flirts with everyone and has never been in a serious relationship. Nikitha alias Nikki is a young woman, who dreams of having a husband like Lord Ram. One day, on the way to work, she sees a group of women, striking, not to suspend Vicky, who was caught red handed by the dean of the University while romancing with her daughter. 

Nikki gets disgusted on hearing about Vicky and says that he is a "dangerous character". Nikki's brother is marrying Vicky's younger sister, so Nikki is told to go for shopping with Vicky. A reluctant Nikki goes with him for shopping. Gradually, Nikki discovers Vicky's gentle side and falls for him. She confesses her love to Vicky and asks him to be in a relationship for two months. Vicky agrees, but soon becomes very uncomfortable with the relationship and confesses to his best friend Chitti. Nikki overhears their conversation and breaks up with him, thinking that she was nothing, but a burden on Vicky and also he was not happy with her. 

After Nikki leaves for London, Vicky realises he truly loves Nikki and heads to London to prove his love for her. When Vicky reaches London, he learns that Nikki has told about him to everyone living in the colony in which she lives and being the colony's favorite, the whole colony including his uncle and Nikki's friends bear a grudge against him. He is introduced to them as Krishna by Pulla Rao, who lives in the same colony and starts befriending her family. Vicky tries multiple methods to show his love to her, but she disapproves all his efforts. After the disapproval, Vicky realizes that Nikki is adamant and will not take him back. He confesses the truth to Nikki's family and leaves for the airport to leave for India. 

Nikki's family makes her realise her mistake and Vicky's love for her. After realizing her mistake, Nikki leaves for the airport hurriedly to stop Vicky from leaving London. A hurrying Nikki parks her car by damaging the other and desperately searches for Vicky. Nikki notices Vicky talking with the girl with whom he has already flirted. Out of anger, Nikki approaches and slaps that girl. Vicky tells her that she was there to invite him at her wedding. After clearing all the misunderstandings, they reconcile. Later, the cops file a case on Nikki for damaging the car. Nikki tries to convince the officer that she did it accidentally. The officer asks them to have a talk with their superior, who is a lady. Nikki asks Vicky to have a talk. The film ends with Vicky preparing himself to seduce the lady officer, depicting that he will always be a lover boy.

Cast 

 Akhil Akkineni as Vikram Krishna "Vicky"
 Nidhhi Agerwal as Nikitha "Nikki"
 Izabelle Leite as Madhavi, Dean's daughter 
 Kailash Reddy as Bobby
 Raja Chembolu as Kishore
 Naga Babu as Nikitha's father
 Subbaraju as Ramesh Babu, Nikitha's uncle
 Rao Ramesh as Siva Prasad, Vicky's uncle
 Jayaprakash as Krishna Prasad, Vicky's father
 Soundarya as Vicky's Deceased Mother (Portrait only)
 Ajay as Local Goon
 Pavitra Lokesh as Vicky's aunt
 Sithara as Nikitha's mother
 Priyadarshi Pullikonda as Chitti, Vicky's best friend
 Vidyullekha Raman as Linda, Nikki's friend
 Satya Krishnan as Nikki's sister-in-law 
 Raghav Rudra Mulpuru  as Vinod, Vicky's cousin
 Kadambari Kiran as Vicky's relative
 Hyper Aadi as Pulla Rao
Satish Saripalli as Nikki's Uncle
 S. Thaman as cameo appearance in "Koppamga Koppamga" song

Soundtrack

Music composed by S. Thaman. Music released on Sony Music India. The Soundtrack of the film received positive response, especially the song "KopamGa KopamGa".

Reception 
The Times of India gave 3 out of 5 stars stating "It's Akhil who steadies this rocky ship, while composer Thaman remains the unsung hero of the film for its terrific music score. Be it energy, melody or a sense of calm, Thaman's music is a perfect anchor to the film's story. Mr Majnu may not be as heartwarming as Tholi Prema, but has every element in it to make for an engaging watch at the cinemas".

Firstpost gave 3 out of 5 stars stating "Mr Majnu some well-crafted sequences which allow the film to find its emotional core".

Behindwoods gave 2.5 out of 5 stars stating "Akhil's charisma, Nidhhi's acting and some decent writing makes Mr. Majnu a watchable film.".

The Indian Express gave 2.5 out of 5 stars stating "The film aims to strengthen Akhil Akkineni's brand as a 'chocolate hero' and it works. He has played his role with confidence and swag, and makes even cheesy scenes click".

References

External links 
 

2019 romantic comedy-drama films
2010s Telugu-language films
2019 comedy-drama films
2019 films
Buddy drama films
Films shot in London
Indian romantic comedy-drama films
2019 masala films
Films set around New Year
Films directed by Venky Atluri